Lapides v. Board of Regents of University System of Georgia, 535 U.S. 613 (2002), is a decision by the Supreme Court of the United States which ruled that a state voluntarily waives at least part of its Eleventh Amendment immunity when it invokes a federal court's removal jurisdiction. There has subsequently been a "circuit split" in federal courts regarding whether a state waives immunity from liability or only a federal forum.

Background 
A professor filed suit in state court claiming that adding  when they placed sexual harassment allegations in his personnel files violated state tort laws. The university system voluntarily moved the case to federal court and sought dismissal there.

Opinion of the court 
Justice Stephen Breyer delivered the opinion of the Court.

See also
List of United States Supreme Court cases, volume 535
List of United States Supreme Court cases

References

External links
 

United States Eleventh Amendment case law
United States federal jurisdiction case law
United States state sovereign immunity case law
United States Supreme Court cases
United States Supreme Court cases of the Rehnquist Court
United States Supreme Court decisions that overrule a prior Supreme Court decision
University System of Georgia
2002 in United States case law
Sexual harassment in the United States
Kennesaw State University